Elmo Everett Smith (November 19, 1909July 15, 1968) was an American Republican politician who served as the 27th Governor of Oregon from 1956 to 1957.

Early life
Smith was born in Grand Junction, Colorado on November 19, 1909. At the age of ten, his mother died, and at age thirteen, his father died, leaving young Elmo an orphan. He was sent to live with his uncle on a ranch near Wilder, Idaho. He supported himself financially as he pursued an education at the College of Idaho in Caldwell. Smith received his B.A. in History in 1932, and moved to nearby Ontario, Oregon, just across the Snake River from Idaho.

In Ontario, Smith began a long and successful career in the newspaper business. The year he arrived in town, Smith managed the Ontario Argus, and founded the Ontario Observer in 1936. As a newspaper owner and publisher, he began to gain stature in the community and entered politics.

Voters in Ontario elected Smith mayor in 1940, and returned him to office for a second term in 1942. He resigned in 1943 in order to enlist in the U.S. Navy during the Second World War.

Smith earned the rank of Lieutenant, serving in the Pacific Theater of Operations. He flew transport planes, and later commanded an air transport base in the South Pacific. He returned to civilian life at the war's 1945 conclusion.

Upon returning to Ontario, its citizens returned Smith to the mayor's office. He continued to manage his newspaper holdings, purchasing the John Day Blue Mountain Eagle, and gaining an interest in The Madras Pioneer; while selling off his Ontario papers. In 1948, voters in Grant, Malheur, and Harney counties elected him to represent the region in the state senate.

President of the Oregon State Senate
State Senator Smith would stand up to the influential trucking and powerful lumber industry lobbies to gain passage of an increase in the state highway tax. His support for transportation projects gained him the chairmanship on the Senate Roads and Highways Committee in 1952, and was elected President of the Senate in 1955.

Governorship
The unexpected death of Governor Paul L. Patterson on January 31, 1956 elevated Senate President Elmo Smith to fill out the remainder of the first half of his term. Upon assuming office, Smith found himself running the state and a campaign for the 1956 gubernatorial election.

His administration successfully raised spending on Public Education, formed a commission on aging, and joined a tri-state water-power consortium. He managed the state's finances in a fiscally conservative manner.

Governor Smith also helped create the Water Resources Board, the agency that today manages and regulates Oregon's water resources.

While winning the Republican nomination for governor, Smith was defeated in his attempt to win the governorship in his own right, to complete the last 2 years of Patterson's term. Robert D. Holmes, his Democratic challenger, managed to win a narrow victory in the 1956 gubernatorial race.

Later life
After leaving Salem, Smith concentrated on his newspaper empire, purchasing several weekly newspapers and the Albany Democrat-Herald, his largest acquisition. He ended up moving to Albany to better manage the Democrat-Herald.

Smith returned to politics in a bid for the United States Senate seat opened by the death of Richard Neuberger in 1960. Smith lost this race to Maurine Neuberger, the Senator's widow. A run for National Chairman for the Republican Party failed in 1964. His last attempt at elected office, the chairmanship of the Oregon State Republican Party was successful.

Death and legacy
Smith died of cancer on July 15, 1968 in Albany, aged 58, and is buried in the Willamette Memorial Park Mausoleum.

Smith's son, Dennis Alan "Denny" Smith, represented Oregon in the United States Congress from 1981 to 1991 and was the Republican nominee for Governor of Oregon in 1994.

References

Further reading
 Klooster, Karl. Round the Roses II: More Past Portland Perspectives, pg. 137, 1992

External links
 Oregon State Archives: Smith Administration – Photo, bio, records, and some public speeches of Governor Smith.
 

1909 births
1968 deaths
20th-century American politicians
United States Navy personnel of World War II
American newspaper publishers (people)
College of Idaho alumni
Deaths from cancer in Oregon
Republican Party governors of Oregon
Mayors of places in Oregon
People from Albany, Oregon
People from Grand Junction, Colorado
People from Ontario, Oregon
People from Wilder, Idaho
Presidents of the Oregon State Senate
Republican Party Oregon state senators
Oregon Republican Party chairs
United States Navy officers
Military personnel from Oregon
Military personnel from Colorado